Alexis is an unincorporated community in Cherokee County, in the U.S. state of Alabama.

History
A post office called Alexis was established in 1884, and remained in operation until it was discontinued in 1906. Alexis is the Anglicization of a Cherokee name, according to local history.

Demographics
According to the returns from 1850-2010 for Alabama, it has never reported a population figure separately on the U.S. Census.

References

Unincorporated communities in Cherokee County, Alabama
Unincorporated communities in Alabama